Ríos Rosas may refer to:

 Antonio de los Ríos y Rosas
 Ríos Rosas (Madrid)
 Ríos Rosas (Madrid Metro)